Pine Street Market is a food hall in the United Carriage and Baggage Transfer Building in the Old Town Chinatown neighborhood of Portland, Oregon, curated by Feast Portland co-founder Mike Thelin. The building's renovation cost $5 million. The market opened in April 2016.

Tenants 
It has eight tenants in a  space:
 Brass Bar: coffees, teas
 Common Law: European-Asian food, and alcoholic beverages
 Kinboshi Ramen: Japanese ramen chain (formerly Marukin Ramen)
 OP Wurst (by Olympia Provisions): frankfurters
 Pollo Bravo: standing bar, tapas, rotisserie chicken
 Shanghai's Best
 Shalom Y'all: Israeli-inspired street-food
 Trifecta Annex: toast, bread, pizza
 Wiz Bang Bar (by Salt & Straw): ice cream shop

See also

 James Beard Public Market, a nearby proposed public market
 Portland Saturday Market

References

External links

 

2016 establishments in Oregon
Economy of Portland, Oregon
Food halls
Food markets in the United States
Old Town Chinatown
Southwest Portland, Oregon